The Magnificent Lie is a 1931 American pre-Code drama film directed by Berthold Viertel and written by Vincent Lawrence, Leonard Merrick and Samson Raphaelson. The film stars Ruth Chatterton, Ralph Bellamy, Stuart Erwin, Françoise Rosay, Sam Hardy, Charles Boyer and Tyler Brooke. The film was released on July 25, 1931, by Paramount Pictures. It was based on Merrick's novel Laurels and the Lady.

Plot

Recovering from a World War I head wound, soldier Bill Childers is paid a hospital visit by Rosa Duchene, a renowned French singer and actress who is contributing to the war effort. It is love at first sight, but Bill does not see her again for 12 years, during which time his combat injury has left him almost totally blind.

In the lumber business with partner Elmer Graham, word comes that the famous Rosa is coming to town to perform. Bill excitedly brings her flowers, but is duped by two French actors into believing that another woman, known as Poll, is actually Rosa.

Bill goes permanently blind and the haughty Rosa has no interest in him. Poll falls for Bill, but during her impersonation of the other woman, Bill recognizes their disparity in height. He is angered by her deception, he angrily leaves. An auto accident results in a serious leg injury for Poll but the sudden restoration of Bill's eyesight. Both agree to give their relationship one more try.

Cast

See also
Fool's Paradise (1921)

References

External links
 
 

1931 films
American drama films
1931 drama films
Paramount Pictures films
Films directed by Berthold Viertel
American black-and-white films
Remakes of American films
Sound film remakes of silent films
Films scored by Karl Hajos
1930s English-language films
1930s American films